The 1929 Westlake exposition was a world's fair held in Xihu District, Hangzhou, Zhejiang province, Republic of China in 1929.  The event opened on June 6, 1929, lasting 137 days. There were 14,760,000 items in the exhibit with 20,000,000 visitors.

The main architect/designer was Liu Jipiao (1900-1992). He studied art and architecture at L'Ecole des Beaux Arts in Paris, France. Liu dedicated 6 months of his life to organize and create the Expo. He and his cohorts (such as Lin Fengmian) believed that this would bring modern (western) art influences to the masses. They were hoping to strengthen and modernize China through art and culture.

See also
 History of Shanghai expo
 Liu Jipiao

References

World's fairs in China
History of Hangzhou
1929 in China
1929 festivals